Acharya Prem Suri was a Jain Svetambar Murtipujaka Acharya. He belonged to the Tapa Gaccha sub-sect of the religion. After his death, his tradition was divided into two; led by Ramachandra Suri Maharaj Saheb and Bhuvanbhanu Suri Maharaj Saheb respectively.

Prem Suri Maharaj was a disciple of the Jain monk Acharya Dansuriji. Along with Vijayanandsuri, Dharma Vijay and Nitin Suri, he reformed the Samvegi monks.

Notes

References

Indian Jain monks 
19th-century Indian Jains 
19th-century Jain monks 
19th-century Indian monks
Jain acharyas
Śvētāmbara monks

"Sambharana suri prem na" book published in vs 2039.